Early American Roots is an album with twenty-two tracks released on compact disc by Hesperus released on April 22, 1997.

Instrumentation
The musical instruments are the recorder, Baroque violin, viola da gamba, flageolet, hammered dulcimer, Baroque guitar, and cittern.

Track listing
Madison's Whim/The Merry Strollers/The Killerman
Bobbing Joe Medley: Bobbing Joe
Cuckholds all in a Row/Rufty Tufty/Parson's Farewell
Captain Kidd/Nashville
A Sett of Hornpipes
Butter'd Peas
Daphne
La Poulle
Childgrove
Spirit of Gambo
Portsmouth/Staines Morris/Lusty Gallant/Chelsea Reach
Argeers
Daniel Purcell's Ground
New Jersey/The Ball
John Come Kiss Me Now
Rockbridge/The Garden Hymn
A Sett of Jiggs
Scotch Cap
The Merry Milkmaids
The President's March/Ça Ira
The Swallow/The Colly Flower
Johnny Cock thy Beaver

1997 albums
Hesperus albums